Marius Tucă (born 29 July 1966, in Caracal, Olt County, Romania) is a Romanian journalist and TV host.

He distinguished himself in the 1990s as a political analyst and a TV host. He also contributed to the transformation of the Jurnalul Naţional newspaper into the best selling broadsheet in Romania. In 1997–1998, he hosted Milionarii de la miezul nopţii  on Antena 1. After 1998, the show was named Marius Tucă Show. The TV show ceased in 2005. A short spell of the TV talk show in fall 2007 flopped and, as of 2008, he is again working exclusively only the newspaper. From 1 September 2020, after the new television station of Adrian Sârbu, Aleph News was launched, the show “Marius Tucă Show” returned, after a long break, with new topics, and new guests every night.

References

1966 births
Living people
People from Caracal, Romania
Romanian television personalities
Romanian newspaper editors
Romanian newspaper founders
Romanian political journalists